Miloš Obrenović (born 12 May 1988) is a Serbian professional basketball coach.

Coaching career 
Obrenović coached Sloboda Užice and the Bosnian team Varda HE. Obrenović was an assistant coach for the Turkish club Banvit until 2018.

In September 2019, Obrenović was hired as the head coach for the Crvena zvezda Cadets (under-16 team), succeeding Slobodan Klipa who took the Zvezda's Juniors.

National teams coaching career
Obrenović was an assistant coach of the U18 Serbia national team that won the silver medal at the 2011 FIBA Europe Under-18 Championship in Poland. Obrenović was an assistant coach of the U16 Serbia national team that won the bronze medal at the 2012 FIBA Europe Under-16 Championship in Latvia and Lithuania. At both championships (2011 and 2012), he was an assistant coach to the head coach Marko Ičelić. Also, Obrenović was an assistant coach at the 2015 FIBA Europe Under-16 Championship in Kaunas, Lithuania.

References

External links
 Milos Obrenovic at eurobasket.com

1988 births
Living people
KK Crvena zvezda youth coaches
KK Sloboda Užice coaches
Serbian expatriate basketball people in Bosnia and Herzegovina
Serbian expatriate basketball people in Turkey
Serbian men's basketball coaches
Sportspeople from Užice